Talybont-on-Usk railway station was a station in Talybont-on-Usk, Powys, Wales. The station was opened in 1863 and closed in 1962.

References

Further reading

Disused railway stations in Powys
Former Brecon and Merthyr Tydfil Junction Railway stations
Railway stations in Great Britain opened in 1863
Railway stations in Great Britain closed in 1962